Probable G-protein coupled receptor 179 is a protein that in humans is encoded by the GPR179 gene.

Clinical relevance 

Mutations in this gene have been associated to cases of congenital stationary Night Blindness.

References

Further reading

G protein-coupled receptors